Final Cut is a film released in 1998, jointly written and directed by Dominic Anciano and Ray Burdis (who also appear in the film). It features several actors from the Primrose Hill set. It was nominated for the Golden Hitchcock at the 1999 Dinard Festival of British Cinema. All the characters (except Tony, played by Perry Benson) in this film share their forename with the actors who play them, a gimmick used in the directors' later film Love, Honour and Obey.

Plot outline
The film opens with the cast gathering after the funeral of Jude to see a film he had been working on for two years. It turns out that the film is secret videos of all those gathered together in their most despicable moments including thievery, spousal abuse, adultery, etc. The revelations remove the masks from the so-called close friends.

Cast
 Perry Benson as Tony
 Ray Winstone as Ray
 Sadie Frost as Sadie
 John Beckett as John
 William Scully as Bill
 Mark Burdis as Mark
 Jude Law as Jude
 Lisa Marsh as Lisa
 Ray Burdis as Burdis
 Dominic Anciano as Dominic
 Holly Davidson as Holly

As with most films involving the Primrose Hill set, there are numerous links between the cast members. Sadie Frost appears alongside her husband Jude Law and her sister Holly Davidson; brothers Ray and Mark Burdis both appear in the film; Ray Burdis and Dominic Anciano have worked together throughout their careers; and Winstone, Burdis and Benson all appeared in Scum.

See also
 The Final Cut, a sci-fi thriller film released in 2004

External links
 
 
 Holly Davidson Website

1998 films
American drama films
1998 drama films
American independent films
1998 independent films
1990s English-language films
1990s American films